The 2021 Rally Estonia (also known as the Rally Estonia 2021) was a motor racing event for rally cars that was held over four days between 15 and 18 July 2021. It marked the eleventh running of the Rally Estonia. The event was the seventh round of the 2021 World Rally Championship, World Rally Championship-2 and World Rally Championship-3. It was also the third round of the 2021 Junior World Rally Championship. The 2021 event was based in the town of Tartu in Tartu County and contested over twenty-four special stages totalling  in competitive distance.

Ott Tänak and Martin Järveoja were the defending rally winners. Their team, Hyundai Shell Mobis WRT, were the defending manufacturers' winners. Mads Østberg and Torstein Eriksen were the defending winners in the WRC-2 category. In the WRC-3 category, Oliver Solberg and Aaron Johnston were the reigning rally winners, but they did not defend their titles as they were promoted to higher classes by Hyundai Motorsport. In the junior category, Mārtiņš Sesks and Renārs Francis were the defending winners.

Kalle Rovanperä and Jonne Halttunen won the rally, the first of their careers. At the age of twenty, Rovanperä became the youngest driver to win a WRC event. Their team, Toyota Gazoo Racing WRT, were the manufacturer's winners. Andreas Mikkelsen and Ola Fløene won the World Rally Championship-2 category, while Aleksey Lukyanuk and Yaroslav Fedorov won the World Rally Championship-3 category. The Finnish crew of Sami Pajari and Marko Salminen was the winner in the junior class.

Background

Championship standings prior to the event
Reigning World Champions Sébastien Ogier and Julien Ingrassia entered the round with a thirty-four-point lead over Elfyn Evans and Scott Martin. Thierry Neuville and Martijn Wydaeghe were third, a further twenty-two points behind. In the World Rally Championship for Manufacturers, Toyota Gazoo Racing WRT held a massive fifty-nine-point lead over defending manufacturers' champions Hyundai Shell Mobis WRT, followed by M-Sport Ford WRT.

In the World Rally Championship-2 standings, Andreas Mikkelsen and Ola Fløene held a two-point lead ahead of Mads Østberg and Torstein Eriksen in the drivers' and co-drivers' standings respectively, with Marco Bulacia Wilkinson and Marcelo Der Ohannesian in third. In the teams' championship, Movisport and Toksport WRT co-leading the championship, with M-Sport Ford WRT in third.

In the World Rally Championship-3 standings, Yohan Rossel and Alexandre Coria led drivers' and co-drivers' championship respectively. Kajetan Kajetanowicz and Maciek Szczepaniak were second, trailed by Nicolas Ciamin and Yannick Roche.

In the junior championship, Mārtiņš Sesks and Renars Francis led Sami Pajari and Marko Salminen by nine points. Jon Armstrong and Phil Hall were third, four points further back. In the Nations' standings, Latvia held a ten-point lead over Finland, with United Kingdom in third.

Entry list
The following crews were set to enter the rally. The event was open to crews competing in the World Rally Championship, its support categories, the World Rally Championship-2 and World Rally Championship-3, Junior World Rally Championship and privateer entries that were not registered to score points in any championship. Ten entries for the World Rally Championship were received, as were ten in the World Rally Championship-2 and fourteen in the World Rally Championship-3. A further eight crews were set to enter the Junior World Rally Championship in Ford Fiesta Rally4s.

Route

Itinerary
All dates and times are EEST (UTC+3).

Report

World Rally Cars

Classification

Special stages

Championship standings

World Rally Championship-2

Classification

Special stages

Championship standings

World Rally Championship-3

Classification

Special stages

Championship standings

Junior World Rally Championship

Classification

Special stages

Championship standings

Notes

References

External links

  
 2021 Rally Estonia at eWRC-results.com
 The official website of the World Rally Championship

2021 in Estonian sport
Estonia
July 2021 sports events in Estonia
2021